The binomial name Pleurothallis punctata refers to 2 species of orchids:
Pleurothallis punctata Barb.Rodr., a synonym of Acianthera serpentula,
Pleurothallis punctata Ker Gawl., a synonym of Notylia punctata.